The Moghbazar-Mouchak Flyover is the second largest  flyover in Bangladesh. Its foundation stone was laid in 2011.

The flyover was partially opened on 30 March 2016. It was fully opened on 26 October 2017.

References

Transport in Bangladesh